John Wilson (fl. 1621) was an English politician.

He was a Member (MP) of the Parliament of England for Castle Rising in 1621.

References

Year of birth missing
Year of death missing
English MPs 1621–1622